Haren Bhumij is member of Indian National Congress and Member of Parliament, Lok Sabha from Dibrugarh (Lok Sabha constituency) in 1977 and 1984.  He was also elected as the Member of Legislative Assembly from Lahowal (Vidhan Sabha constituency) in 1991.

See also 

 Dibrugarh (Lok Sabha constituency)
 Lahowal (Vidhan Sabha constituency)

References 

Living people
Indian National Congress politicians
Assam MLAs 1972–1978
Assam MLAs 1985–1991
Bhumij people
Year of birth missing (living people)
Indian National Congress politicians from Assam